
This is a list of people from Lincoln, Nebraska.

References

See also
 :Category:People from Lincoln, Nebraska

Lincoln, Nebraska
Lincoln
Lincoln, Nebraska